The Fisherman is a sculpture of a bare-footed fisherman named Isidro by Mexican artist Ramiz Barquet. Two copies are installed in Puerto Vallarta, in the Mexican state of Jalisco. The sculpture has been described as "a leading visual symbol" of the city. The bronze sculpture in Centro was completed in 1996, and dedicated on January 12, 1996. Another statue is installed along the Malecón in Zona Romántica.

References

External links

 
 The Fisherman – Puerto Vallarta, Jalisco, Mexico at Waymarking

1996 establishments in Mexico
1996 sculptures
Bronze sculptures in Mexico
Centro, Puerto Vallarta
Fish in art
Outdoor sculptures in Puerto Vallarta
Sculptures of men in Mexico
Statues in Jalisco
Zona Romántica